Whyteleafe is a village in the district of Tandridge, Surrey, England, with a few streets falling inside the London Borough of Croydon. The village, in a dry valley of the North Downs, has three railway stations (on two parallel lines). Neighbouring villages and towns include Woldingham, Caterham, Coulsdon, Warlingham, and Kenley. To the west are Kenley Aerodrome, Kenley Common (owned by the Corporation), Coxes Wood, and Blize Wood. To the east are Riddlesdown, the Dobbin and Marden Park.

The churchyard contains graves of airmen who died during WWII, stationed at RAF Kenley nearby.  The village forms part of the Greater London Built-up Area.

History
The village name comes from the distinctive white underside of the whitebeam trees growing in the area. In 1855 Nathaniel Glover purchased White Leaf field and George Henry Drew later completed the building that was called "White Leafe House".  By 1881 the surrounding area had become known as "Whiteleafe".   As with Kenley the history of its land before that was that of other parishes, in this case Caterham and to a lesser extent Warlingham and Coulsdon.

Its first primary school was built in 1892, enlarged in 1900 and again in 1907.

In 1911 the population of Whyteleafe was "now larger than that of Warlingham village...A county council secondary school for girls has been set up in this year (1911)."

Amenities
Whyteleafe has: a large pub, a micropub, a newsagent, general store, two petrol stations (M&S and Waitrose food outlets), a post office, hairdresser, chemist, ladies' outfitter, baker, fish and chip shop, kebab shop, Indian restaurant, Chinese restaurant, launderette, barber, Tesco Express and an e-cigarette store.

To the south of Whyteleafe are the headquarters of Gold Group International, the largest employer in the parish boundaries.

Whyteleafe School, is a primary school which is part of the multi academy trust GLF and is situated at the bottom of Whyteleafe Hill. It makes use of the site of the former Whyteleafe Girls' Grammar School, vacated in the late 1970s. Warlingham School (secondary) is at the top of Tithe Pit Shaw Lane, on the edge of Whyteleafe in the east.

The C of E church of St Luke was built in 1866, founded as a new parish in the Diocese of Southwark.

Transport
There are three railway stations: Whyteleafe South, Whyteleafe and Upper Warlingham. All three stations are served by Southern services. The Godstone road (A22) cuts through north to south. Bus routes 407 and 434 serve the area and run from Coulsdon, Croydon, Sutton, and Caterham. Whyteleafe village grew after the railway came on its way to Caterham in 1856. A second line, the Oxted Line, following a slightly higher contour, opened in 1884. It serves different destinations to the south but also runs to London Bridge or Victoria.

Sport and leisure
AFC Whyteleafe is the main football club following the closure of Whyteleafe F.C. in 2021. AFC Whyteleafe, like its predessor plays in grounds on Church Road where the former club moved in 1959, when it moved from the field off New Barn Lane, now utilised by the adjacent Kenley School. Separate from its ground in the west of town is the large recreation ground below wooded hills in the east of town which has informal sports fields and a playground.

Caterham and Whyteleafe Tennis Club is located in Manor Park near Whyteleafe South Station. The Surrey National Golf Club is located in nearby Chaldon.

Local government

Surrey County Council, headquartered in Reigate, elected every four years, has one councillor representing Caterham Valley, which incorporates the civil parishes of Caterham Valley and Whyteleafe.

Whyteleafe has 2 representatives on Tandridge District Council, headquartered in Oxted:

Whyteleafe is one of 21 civil parish councils in Tandridge District electing seven parish councillors every four years. The parish council clerk is Simon Bold.

Demography and housing

The average level of accommodation in the region composed of detached houses was 28%, the average that was apartments was 22.6%.

The proportion of households in the civil parish who owned their home outright compares to the regional average of 35.1%.  The proportion who owned their home with a loan compares to the regional average of 32.5%.  The remaining % is made up of rented dwellings (plus a negligible % of households living rent-free).

See also

List of places of worship in Tandridge (district)

References

External links
Village Council
History of the village of Whyteleafe
Whyteleafe Primary School
Photos of Whyteleafe in the 1930s, 1954 and 2002

Villages in Surrey
Tandridge
Civil parishes in Surrey